Kent College is an independent day and boarding school from 3-18. Forest Explorers Nursery is for girls and boys from rising 3 years, boys can join Reception Class and Year 1, and from September 2023 Year 2 as the Prep School becomes a co-ed school. The Senior School and Sixth Form are girls only from 11-18.

Location
Set in a 75-acre rural parkland estate in Pembury just outside Tunbridge Wells, the school consists of a Victorian manor house and with facilities including The Countess of Wessex Theatre, science centre, two indoor sports halls, music centre, astro, library and art centre, forest school, dance studio and two boarding houses. The grounds are adjacent to Pembury Old Church, and the nearest railway stations are in Tonbridge and Tunbridge Wells.

History
In 1886, the school was established in Bouverie Road, Folkestone with twelve female pupils. John Stainer was one of the founders. The original site of the school is now occupied by apartments, which are named after heads of the school. In 1939, the school moved to its current location in Tunbridge Wells because of the danger to girls being too near the coast during World War II. During the war, the school was hit by a V-1 flying bomb, a German aircraft was shot down inside the school's grounds, and a pilot of a Hawker Hurricane died when his aircraft crashed inside the school's grounds. In 1945, the Prep School was established in Tunbridge Wells, and in 1989 it moved to the same location as the Senior School.

Prep School

The Prep School is located on the same site as the main school and is housed in its own buildings and shares many of the facilities at the Senior School. Full, weekly and flexi boarding are available to Prep School pupils aged 10 and above.

School heads

 Edith Margaret James
1983–1989 John C.A. Barrett
1990–2002 Barbara Crompton
2002–2007 Anne E. Upton
2008–2015 Sally-Anne Huang
2016–2021 Julie Lodrick
2022–present Katrina Handford

Notable former pupils

Sarah Sands, former Editor of The Sunday Telegraph newspaper, current editor of the Today Programme
Sophie, Duchess of Edinburgh
Suki Brownsdon, swimmer

References

Further reading
The Kent College Saga by Margaret James, published by the Governors of Kent College, 1986, ASIN B00169BIPU

External links
 School Website
 Profile at MyDaughter
 Kent College, Pembury, Kent at ISBI
 Kent College Preparatory School, Pembury, Kent at ISBI
 ISI Inspection Reports – Prep School & Senior School

Educational institutions established in 1886
Girls' schools in Kent
Private schools in Kent
Methodist schools in England
Member schools of the Girls' Schools Association
Boarding schools in Kent
1886 establishments in England